The Fat Controller, whose real name is Sir Topham Hatt, is a fictional character in The Railway Series books written by Reverend W. Awdry and his son, Christopher Awdry. In the first two books in the series (The Three Railway Engines and Thomas the Tank Engine) he is known as The Fat Director, and as of the third book (James the Red Engine) he becomes The Fat Controller, as the railway has been nationalised. Sir Topham Hatt's full name is revealed in the foreword to the 1951 book Henry the Green Engine.

The Fat Controller also appears in the television series Thomas & Friends, adapted from the books. On television, he was usually portrayed in the form of several different static figures made with either wood or lead during series one, and resin from series two onwards, but has been portrayed using CGI from the twelfth season onward.

The term "fat controller" has since been adopted in various contexts in the English language, beyond the sphere of the original stories, usually in reference to someone who runs a railway.

Origin of nickname
The character is first seen in "The Sad Story of Henry" in the first book in the Railway Series, The Three Railway Engines. When Henry refused to leave a tunnel, the story says that "A fat director, who was on the train, told the guard to get a rope". The character is referred to as The Fat Controller from the third book, James the Red Engine, for the remainder of the Railway Series, due to the nationalisation of British Railways. The name Sir Topham Hatt is first mentioned in the foreword to Henry the Green Engine and also appears on his luggage trunk in the same book in the story "Percy and the Trousers". The first use of the name Sir Topham Hatt in the TV series comes in the episode 'The Sad Story of Henry' when the narrator (Ringo Starr in both US and UK versions and George Carlin in the second US version) introduces him to the audience.

Biography (Railway Series)
There have been three Fat Controllers. This is not revealed directly in the stories, as they all look very similar and are all known as Sir Topham Hatt. However, the books The Island of Sodor: Its People, History and Railways (written by Rev. W. Awdry and George Awdry) and Sodor: Reading Between the Lines (by Christopher Awdry) make this clear.

Sir Topham Hatt, 1st Baronet (1880-1956)
He was a talented engineer who was apprenticed with Sir William Stanier at the Great Western Railway's Swindon works, which gave him a great love of all things Great Western. He went on to assist A. W. Dry in the construction of the Tidmouth, Knapford and Elsbridge Light Railway, which became the branch line, and designed the locomotives that ran upon it.

When the standard gauge railways of the Island were merged into the North Western Railway in 1914, Topham Hatt was called upon for his engineering skill. He constructed a bridge to link Sodor with the Mainland, as well as a number of branch lines and improvements to locomotive facilities. He was immediately made a Director of the railway.

Topham married Jane Brown and fathered a son (Charles Topham Hatt) and a daughter (Barbara Jane Hatt). Jane was sister to Sir Handel Brown, Liberal MP for Sodor East and owner of the Skarloey Railway, making all successive descendants of the two railway families cousins. Charles wed Amanda Croarie, daughter of the owner of the Ffarquhar Quarry Company, and Barbara married Henry Regaby, the Viscount Harwick. In light of this, Topham's family unit can be seen as an alliance of several of the most prominent families in Sodor.

When the North Western Railway was nationalised and became part of British Railways in 1948, Topham Hatt was made Controller of the railway. 1948 also saw him made a baronet for his services to the railways of Sodor. He retired as Controller in 1952 and died in 1956 at age 76.

This Fat Controller appears to be the one shown in the series.

He appeared in:

 The Three Railway Engines 
 The Sad Story of Henry
 Edward, Gordon and Henry
 Thomas the Tank Engine
 Thomas' Train
 Thomas and the Trucks
 Thomas and the Breakdown Train
 James the Red Engine 
 Tank Engine Thomas Again
 Thomas and the Guard 
 Thomas Goes Fishing
 Thomas and Bertie 
 Troublesome Engines
 Henry and the Elephant 
 Tenders and Turntables 
 Trouble in the Shed
 Percy Runs Away
 Henry the Green Engine
 Coal
 The Flying Kipper
 Gordon's Whistle
 Percy and the Trousers
 Henry's Sneeze 
 Toby the Tram Engine
 Gordon the Big Engine
 Edward the Blue Engine
 Saved from Scrap 
 Old Iron

Sir Charles Topham Hatt, 2nd Baronet (1914-1997)
Charles Topham Hatt was the son of the first Sir Topham Hatt and the second Controller of the NWR. He too served an apprenticeship with Stanier, this time working under the locomotive designer. Like his father, he was an innovative engineer and made a number of improvements to the railway and its engines. He was also the originator of the scheme to construct the Arlesdale Railway and the ballast consortium that used it.

He was responsible for the line's policy of retaining steam locomotives long after they had been abolished on the rest of British Railways, and while Dr Beeching was closing down branch lines on the Mainland, Charles was reopening them on Sodor. He retired as Controller in 1984, and died in 1997 at age 83.

He appeared in:

Percy the Small Engine
 Percy and the Signal 
 Duck Takes Charge
 Percy's Promise
 The Eight Famous Engines
 Percy Takes the Plunge
 Gordon Goes Foreign
 Double Header 
 The Fat Controller's Engines
 Duck and the Diesel Engine
 Domeless Engines 
 Pop Goes the Diesel
 Dirty Work
 A Close Shave
 The Twin Engines
 Branch Line Engines
 Thomas Comes to Breakfast
 Daisy
 Percy's Predicament
 Stepney the "Bluebell" Engine
 Bluebells of England 
 Bowled Out
 Main Line Engines
 Buzz, Buzz 
 Wrong Road
 Edward's Exploit 
 Small Railway Engines - Ballast 
 Enterprising Engines
 Tenders for Henry
 Super Rescue 
 Escape 
 Little Western
 Oliver the Western Engine
 Donald's Duck 
 Resource and Sagacity
 Toad Stands By
 Bulgy 
 Tramway Engines
 Woolly Bear 
 Toby's Tightrope
 Really Useful Engines
 Stop Thief!
 Fish
 Triple-Header

Sir Stephen Topham Hatt, 3rd Baronet (1941-)
Stephen Topham Hatt was first seen as a child in the book Toby the Tram Engine. As an adult, he was made the third Controller of the North Western Railway. His son, Richard Topham Hatt, is tipped to be the next Fat Controller on Stephen's retirement, and at Stephen's death, he will inherit the family's baronetcy and the title 'Sir Topham Hatt'.

He appeared in:
 Toby the Tram Engine - Toby and the Stout Gentleman
 James and the Diesel Engines
 Old Stuck-Up 
 Crossed Lines 
 More About Thomas the Tank Engine
 Thomas, Percy and the Coal 
 The Runaway
 Better Late Than Never 
 Gordon the High-Speed Engine
 High-Speed Gordon 
 Smokescreen 
 Fire Escape
 Gordon Proves His Point
 Toby, Trucks and Trouble
 Mavis and the Lorry
 Toby's Seaside Holiday 
 Bulstrode 
 Toby Takes the Road
 Thomas and the Twins
 Scrambled Eggs
 Trevor Helps Out
 Thomas and the Great Railway Show
 Museum-Piece
 Not the Ticket 
 Trouble on the Line 
 Thomas and the Railtour
 Thomas Comes Home
 Snow Problem 
 Washout! 
 Thomas Comes Home
 Henry and the Express
 Out of Puff 
 Overhaul
 Sliding Scales
 Henry Sees Red
 Wilbert the Forest Engine
 Percy's Porridge
 Wired-Up
 Thomas and the Fat Controller's Engines
 Birdstrike
 Edward and the Cabbages
 Rabbits 
 Golden Jubilee
 Thomas and Victoria
 Overloaded 
 Avalanche 
 Toby's Vintage Train
 Thomas and his Friends
 Thomas and the Swan
 Buffer Bashing
 Gordon's Fire Service 
 Centenary

Biography (television series)

In the television series, The Fat Controller is always the same man, with the same wife and grandchildren. He is in his mid 60s (as evident in a newspaper article in the Great Discovery), although his voice in the UK versions sometimes hints at old age. Very little of his history is revealed, although we do see more of his extended family, including his mother (Dowager Hatt), and his mischievous twin brother (Sir Lowham Hatt). In the first season, he and all the other human characters were made out of lead. From the second season onwards, they were made out of resin so they could move around more easily.

He is shown to be a qualified railway engine driver when he brings Percy to the yard for the first time. He is in charge of all the engines on Sodor and seemingly has a great deal of say over other vehicles. As a young man, he learnt to drive in Elizabeth the vintage Sentinel lorry, though in a few episodes, his driving skills are poorly developed, which were used as comedic gags for when the chance arises (often in Winston the Inspection Car). He has overseen the construction of a number of lines, railway services, and has been involved with the opening of several tourist attractions on Sodor.

British narrator Michael Angelis portrayed the character with a strong Yorkshire accent, with a low gruff voice a trait of which has been continued when Pierce Brosnan briefly took over the mantle, and also when individual voice artists were brought in to voice the characters, The Fat Controller being voiced by Keith Wickham in both the UK and US versions from 2015 onwards. Kerry Shale initially voiced him in the US prior to 2015, and gave the character a clear American accent and a deep, booming voice. In the American version, he has always been referred to by his actual name, Sir Topham Hatt, possibly because "fat" is a much more pejorative term in the US than in the UK.

The Fat Controller's name was revealed to be Bertram by Alicia Botti, the famous opera singer, in "Play Time", and by his mother Dowager Hatt in "Percy's Parcel", "Jitters and Japes", "Edward the Hero" and "Stop that Bus!".

Mode of dress
In his iconic top hat and morning suit, the Fat Controller looks rather old-fashioned and formal.

In the television series, Sir Topham's suit has often been used for comic effect, being augmented with scarf and mittens in winter. The series plays on the outdated nature of this outfit, giving Sir Topham an entire wardrobe of old-fashioned and formal clothes for occasions when he is not "on duty". In the Series 8 episode "Halloween", he is shown wearing pyjamas and a nightcap, and in the Series 9 and 10 episodes "Flour Power" and "Sticky Toffee Thomas" he is briefly shown wearing a wizard costume. In yet another episode, he is shown wearing a kilt, a gift from a visiting Scottish Lord. In various CGI episodes, he dresses like Santa Claus.

Sir Topham's household

Wife: Lady Hatt
Lady Jane Brown Hatt helps her husband run the railway, and is happiest when she sees new lines opened. She has had some special birthday parties. She likes the railway, but had a certain dislike of Annie and Clarabel, calling them beach huts. Later, she took a liking to them, after they got new coats of paint. Although her husband runs a railway, she likes a day out in their car or on a boat.

Voices:
Teresa Gallagher (UK; Season 13 onwards / US; Season 17 and 21 only)
Jules de Jongh (US; Season 13–20, excluding Season 17 and 21)

She has appeared in:
 Season 1 
 Thomas' Train/A Big Day for Thomas 
 Toby and the Stout Gentleman/Tobythe Tram Engine 
 Thomas in Trouble/Thomas Breaks the Rules 
 Season 3 
 A Scarf for Percy 
 Bulgy 
 Season 5
 Lady Hatt's Birthday Party
 Sir Topham Hatt's Holiday
 Season 7
 The Runaway Elephant
 Bulgy Rides Again 
 The Grand Opening
 Best Dressed Engine 
 Season 8
 Thomas and the Tuba 
 Percy and the Magic Carpet 
 Season 9
 Percy and the Oil Painting 
 Thomas and the Birthday Picnic 
 Tuneful Toots 
 Flour Power 
 Season 10
 Thomas and the Jet Plane 
 The Green Controller
 Topped Off Thomas 
 Which Way Now? 
 Season 11
 Thomas Sets Sail 
 Toby's Triumph 
 Thomas and the Runaway Car 
 Duncan Does it All 
 Season 12
 Rosie's Funfair Special/Rosie's Carnival Special 
 Saved You!
 Percy and the Bandstand
 Season 13
 Tickled Pink 
 Double Trouble 
 Toby's New Whistle
 Thomas and the Runaway Kite 
 The Biggest Present of All 
 Season 14
 Charlie and Eddie 
 Pop Goes Thomas 
 Jitters and Japes 
 Season 15
 Up, Up and Away!
 Wonky Whistle 
 Fiery Flynn 
 Season 16
 Express Coming Through 
 Thomas and the Rubbish Train/Thomas and the Garbage Train 
 Thomas and the Sounds of Sodor 
 Muddy Matters 
 Happy Birthday Sir! 
 Season 17
 Wayward Winston 
 The Afternoon Tea Express
 Season 19 
 Who's Geoffrey? 
 Diesel's Ghostly Christmas
 Part 2 
 Reds vs. Blues 
 Season 20 - Engine of the Future 
 Season 21
 Terence Breaks the Ice 
 Confused Coaches 
 Season 22: Big World! Big Adventures! - Rosie is Red
 Films
 Thomas and the Magic Railroad 
 The Great Discovery
 Hero of the Rails 
 Misty Island Rescue 
 Day of the Diesels 
 King of the Railway 
 Sodor's Legend of the Lost Treasure 
 The Great Race

Mother: Dowager Hatt
Dowager Hatt lives on Sodor and in her first appearance in a TV episode ("Gordon and the Gremlin"), her son held a party for her. On this occasion, her Dalmatian dog (soon to be named Gremlin) ran away after being frightened by Gordon's whistle, and ended up in Thomas' cab, where he greatly enjoyed a long ride to the docks. She says the railway is really useful, and the Fat Controller says she is always right.

Voices:
Keith Wickham (Seasons 13 through 21)

She has appeared in:
 Series 5 - Gordon and the Gremlin 
 Series 6 
 It's Only Snow
 Thomas (and) the Jet Engine
 Series 9 - Thomas and the Birthday Picnic 
 Series 11 - Percy and the Left Luggage/Baggage 
 Series 12 - Excellent Emily 
 Series 13 - Percy's Parcel
 Series 14 - Jitters and Japes
 Series 15
 Gordon and Ferdinand
 Percy's New Friends 
 Edward the Hero
 Up, Up and Away!
 Stop that Bus!
 Wonky Whistle 
 Tree Trouble
 Fiery Flynn
 Series 16
 Express Coming Through
 Percy and the Monster of Brendam 
 Thomas and the Sounds of Sodor 
 Muddy Matters 
 Happy Birthday Sir! 
 Series 18
 Toad's Adventure
 Samson Sent for Scrap 
 Millie and the Volcano
 Series 19
 Diesel's Ghostly Christmas
 Part 2 
 The Beast of Sodor
 Reds vs. Blues 
 Series 20
 Engine of the Future
 Buckled Tracks and Bumpy Trucks/Cars
 Series 21
 Dowager Hatt's Busy Day
 Terence Breaks the Ice 
 A Shed for Edward 
 Confused Coaches
 Series 22 - Rosie is Red
 Specials
 Day of the Diesels 
 The Adventure Begins 
 Sodor's Legend of the Lost Treasure 
 The Great Race 
 Big World! Big Adventures! 

She is the only household member to originate in the TV series, never having appeared in the Railway Series books.

Grandchildren: Stephen and Bridget
They both have appeared together in:

Grandson: Stephen Hatt
Stephen Topham Hatt lives on the Island of Sodor, and regularly has outings and holidays with his grandparents and sister. Stephen loves trains, and was excited when he first met Toby the Tram Engine. Stephen also has a bit of knowledge about the Island, of which is the reason they discovered the Old Castle and the mine (in which Bertram was found).

In the Railway Series, Stephen ultimately took the railway over and is the current Fat Controller. In the television series, he has always remained a child.

Voices:
 Matt Wilkinson (UK; Season 13 only)
 Teresa Gallagher (UK; Season 14 onwards / US; Season 19 onwards)
 William Hope (US; Season 13 and 14 only)

He has appeared in:

Granddaughter: Bridget Hatt
Bridget Amanda Hatt lives on Sodor, and regularly goes for outings and holidays with her grandparents and brother. On one occasion they went to Toby's old line, where she thought Toby was an electric tram and was reprimanded by her brother for offending him.

Her parents (mentioned only in the book Sodor: Reading Between the Lines) are Charles and Amanda Hatt.

Voices:
Teresa Gallagher (UK; Season 14 onwards / US; Season 19 onwards)
Jules de Jongh (US; Season 13 and 14 only)

She has appeared in:

Twin brother: Lowham Hatt
Sir Lowham Hatt is the jolly twin brother of Sir Topham Hatt, the son of Dowager Hatt, the great-uncle of Stephen and Bridget Hatt, and the brother-in-law of Lady Hatt.

Lowham is mischievous and enjoys playing with the children. He seems to know little or nothing about railways. He played hide-and-seek with the children and then went into a signal box and pulled the lever, switching Gordon to the branchline. He dresses exactly like Sir Topham but has a moustache. It is unknown how and why he got his knighthood.

He only appears in the series 13 episode, "Double Trouble".

Voices:
 Keith Wickham (UK)
 Kerry Shale (US)

The Hatts' Butler
Sir Topham Hatt has a butler who is featured in The Railway Series and the Thomas & Friends TV series. He has appeared in only three stories - "Thomas in Trouble/Breaks the Rules" in Season 1, "Lady Hatt's Birthday Party" in Season 5 and "Fergus Breaks the Rules / Thomas and the Search for Fergus" in Season 7.

In real life
"Day out with Thomas" events are a popular way of raising money for heritage railways. These events are an opportunity for children to meet characters from the books and television series (or at least, engines that have been "dressed up" to resemble them). These events are invariably presided over by a Fat Controller, played by a railway volunteer of appropriate age and build. The copyright holders are strict about how these volunteers should appear: the South Devon Railway's Fat Controller was forced to either quit or shave off his beard, and it is absolutely forbidden for a Fat Controller to be too thin. In the United States, on the other hand, he is instead portrayed as a costumed character (with the performer's face hidden).

Other uses of the name "Fat Controller"
 In Series 3, Episode 2 of To the Manor Born, during a meeting to protest the closing of the local railway station, the Rector loses his temper with an overweight representative of British Rail, played by Richard Thorp, and refers to him as "the Fat Controller".

References

External links
The Real Lives of Thomas page on the Fat Controller

The Railway Series characters
Thomas & Friends characters
Literary characters introduced in 1945
Fictional baronets and baronetesses
Fictional English people